Shiloh Township may refer to one of the following places in the State of Illinois:
 Shiloh Township, Edgar County, Illinois
 Shiloh Township, Jefferson County, Illinois
 Shiloh Valley Township, St. Clair County, Illinois

See also
 Shiloh Township (disambiguation)

Illinois township disambiguation pages